The Amgen Tour of California 2007 was the second edition of an eight-day, 650-mile (1,045 km) stage race that raced through the California redwoods, wine country and the Pacific Coast. The road bicycle racing event was held February 18, 2007.  The 2007 Tour of California was part of the 2006–2007 UCI America Tour and the inaugural 2007 USA Cycling Professional Tour.

On November 28, 2006, the UCI upgraded the multi-day event from 2.1 (category 1) to 2.HC (English: beyond categorization).

Stages and results

Prologue: San Francisco 
The Prologue was an individual time trial held Sunday, February 18, 2007, in San Francisco.

Stage 1: Sausalito to Santa Rosa 

Stage 1 was held Monday, February 19, 2007. During the second of the three finishing laps in Santa Rosa, a crash took down most of the peloton, including leader Levi Leipheimer. Those not involved in the crash fought for the stage victory, taken by Graeme Brown by mere millimeters.

Riders involved in the crash lost several minutes, but the race officials decided to credit most of them with the winner's time, meaning that Leipheimer retained the leader's jersey. This decision, which meant extending the "safety zone" to 6 miles (10 km) before the end, was criticized by some riders and team staff.

Stage 2: Santa Rosa to Sacramento 
Held Tuesday, February 20, 2007.

Stage 3: Stockton to San Jose 
Held Wednesday, February 21, 2007.

Stage 4: Seaside to San Luis Obispo 
Stage 4 was held Thursday, February 22, 2007. Reigning Olympic and World Champion Paolo Bettini captured Stage 4, the event's longest stage, edging Gerald Ciolek, Juan José Haedo, and Thor Hushovd in a sprint finish after the peloton reeled in a seven-man breakaway consisting of Hilton Clarke, Aaron Olson, Kirk O'Bee, Alejandro Acton, Christophe Laurent, Lucas Euser, and Sean Sullivan.

Stage 5: Solvang time trial 
Held Friday, February 23, 2007, Stage 5 was an individual time trial. Yellow jersey holder Levi Leipheimer extended his lead over second place Jens Voigt and the rest of the field.

Stage 6: Santa Barbara to Santa Clarita 

 Young Rider Classification

 Most Aggressive Rider
 , 

 Team classification

 , 66.56.17
 , +2.19
 , +3.20

Stage 7: Long Beach circuit race 
Held Sunday, February 25, 2007.

Final results 
General Classification after Stage 7 (Final results)

Jersey progress

Teams 

UCI ProTour teams
 C.A - 
 DSC - 
 GST - 
 LIQ - 
 PRL - 
 QSI - 
 RAB - 
 TMO - 
 CSC - 

UCI Professional Continental teams
 HNM - 
 NIC - 
 TSL - 

UCI Continental teams
 BMC - 
 TUT - 

USA Cycling registered teams
 COL - 
 JBC - 
 ABB - 
 USA - USA Cycling National Development Team

References

External links 

  - 2007 Tour Archive
 Live Coverage and Photos Cyclingfans.com

2007
Tour of California 2007
Tour of California 2007
2007 in sports in California